Pride's Castle is a 1949 historical novel by the American writer Frank Yerby. It was ranked ninth on the Publishers Weekly list of bestselling novels that year. Like many of his books it is set in nineteenth century America. Although it was his first novel set in the North, the protagonist is a Southerner. It was adapted as an episode of the The Philco Television Playhouse that aired on NBC in September 1949, with Anthony Quinn, Catherine McLeod and Louise Allbritton in the cast.

Synopsis
Pride Dawson rises to become a robber baron in Gilded Age New York.

References

Bibliography
 Hill, James Lee. Anti-heroic Perspectives: The Life and Works of Frank Yerby. University of Iowa, 1976. 
 Korda, Michael. Making the List: A Cultural History of the American Bestseller, 1900–1999 : as Seen Through the Annual Bestseller Lists of Publishers Weekly. Barnes & Noble Publishing, 2001.

1949 American novels
American historical novels
Novels by Frank Yerby
Dial Press books
Novels set in the 19th century
American novels adapted into television shows